The Fragile, the second album by the folk music duo O'Hooley & Tidow, was released on 9 February 2012 on the No Masters label. It received a four-starred review in The Guardian. The album's title is derived from the words of one of its songs, "Mein Deern", about the dying hours of Heidi Tidow's German grandmother.  The album features guest performances by Andy Cutting, Jackie Oates, Jude Abbott, Cormac Byrne, Anna Esslemont, Sam Pegg, The Solo Players and London's Diversity Choir.

Theme and songs
According to O'Hooley & Tidow, all the songs on The Fragile are linked by the common theme of vulnerability.

A single from the album, "The Last Polar Bear", was released in November 2011. The track was reissued on 1 November 2012 as a double single with "Gentleman Jack". This is a song, also from the album, about Anne Lister, an early 19th-century Yorkshire lesbian gentlewoman.

The words of "Little Boy Blue" are from a 19th-century poem by the American writer, Eugene Field. The poem, about a young boy and his toys, suggests that he dies and is taken by angels and his toys wait for him to return.

"She Lived Beside the Anner" is a traditional folk song from Tipperary, Ireland.

Reception
In a four-starred review, Robin Denselow of The Guardian described The Fragile as an "intriguing, ambitious set" and said that the album's cover version of Massive Attack's "Teardrop" was "an exquisite reworking". Guardian music critic Jude Rogers voted it as one of the best tracks of 2012.

Northern Sky praised the album's "complex string arrangements and fine instrumental accompaniment" and "highly accomplished pieces of musical composition; you can never second guess what's around the corner in terms of sonic exploration". Reviewing the album for Folking.com, Dai Jeffries said "The confidence, power and earthiness of their voices both solo and in harmony are what shine through this excellent album. Folk Wales Online described the album as a "beautiful, entrancing, hypnotic CD" and "breathtakingly original".

Northern Sky music magazine's reviewer described the song "The Last Polar Bear" as "utterly beautiful", saying "This is how love songs should be written".

Holger Brandstaedt, reviewing the album for FolkWorld, said: "The influence of the producer is unmistakable. Some of the tracks sound clearly by Chumbawamba, others have their godfathers in The Beautiful South".

Track listing
 	"The Tallest Tree" (Belinda O'Hooley/Heidi Tidow) 4:34
	"The Last Polar Bear" (Belinda O'Hooley/Heidi Tidow) 3:25
	"Gentleman Jack" (Belinda O'Hooley/Heidi Tidow) 2:47
	"Teardrop" (Robert Del Naja, Grantley Marshall, Andrew Vowles, Elizabeth Fraser)  1:33
	"Little Boy Blue" (words from an 1888 poem by Eugene Field; music by Belinda O'Hooley/Heidi Tidow) 4:27
	"Calling Me" (Belinda O'Hooley/Heidi Tidow) 5:52
	"Mein Deern" (Belinda O'Hooley/Heidi Tidow) 7:20
	"A Daytrip" (Belinda O'Hooley/Heidi Tidow) 4:15
	"Pass It On" (Belinda O'Hooley/Heidi Tidow) 3:14
       "She Lived Beside the Anner" (traditional, arranged by Belinda O'Hooley/Heidi Tidow) 4:17
	"Ronnie's Song" (Belinda O'Hooley/Heidi Tidow) 6:28
	"Madgie in the Summerlands" (Belinda O'Hooley, Heidi Tidow, James Dumbelton, Jackie Oates) 2:32
Total album length = 50:48

Personnel

O'Hooley & Tidow

 Belinda O'Hooley – vocals, piano, dampened piano, accordion, hand claps
 Heidi Tidow – vocals, bells, guitar

Other musicians
 Jude Abbott – euphonium, flugelhorn, cornet
 Cormac Byrne – bodhrán, drums, percussion
 Andy Cutting – diatonic button accordion
 Anna Esslemont – violin
 Diversity Choir – vocals (arranged and directed by Andrea Brown)
 Jackie Oates – bass; lead vocals on "Madgie in the Summerlands"
 Sam Pegg – bass
 Solo Players – strings (Adam Robinson, James Pattinson – violin; Jayne Coyle – viola; Martin Couzin – cello;  Melanie Purves – arrangements)

Production and release 
The album was recorded at Belinda O'Hooley and Heidi Tidow's home in Golcar, West Yorkshire, in September and October 2011 and also at Hill Top Studio, Leeds. Diversity Choir's contribution was recorded live at St Anne's Church, Soho, London. The album was mixed and mastered by Neil Ferguson of Chumbawamba at Hill Top Studio, Leeds. and was released on 9 February 2012 on the No Masters label.

The illustrations on the cover, which was designed by Boff Whalley, are by Kate Aughey. The photographs of O’Hooley & Tidow standing in the sea were taken by Casey Orr at Sandsend in Whitby.

References

External links
 Official website: O'Hooley & Tidow
 Official website: Diversity Choir

2012 albums
O'Hooley & Tidow albums
Whitby